"Under the Influence" is a song co-written and recorded by American singer and songwriter Elle King for her debut studio album, Love Stuff (2015). The song was first released to digital retailers on December 9, 2014 through RCA Records as a promotional single and was serviced to American Triple A radio December 15, 2015 as the album's second official single. As of January 2016, the song has become King's second top-3 hit on the Adult Alternative Songs chart. The music video for "Under The Influence" was released on April 28, 2016. In March 2015 it was used as a promotional song for TCM over older movie clips.

Composition
"Under the Influence" is a blues rock written by Elle King and the song's producer, Dave Bassett, about the challenge of being in love with someone who is no good for you. The lyrics relate this toxic relationship to substance abuse, with the narrator describing herself as being "under the influence" of her significant other. Stephen Thomas Erlewine of AllMusic wrote that King "walks a fine line between rock crunch and soul testifying" on this and other album tracks, while Diffuser noted a "soulful swagger" in the delivery and Kitty Empire of The Guardian described the song's sound as "slinky R&B".

Live performances
King performed "Ex's & Oh's" and "Under the Influence" as the musical guest on the episode of Jimmy Kimmel Live! airing October 26, 2015.

Commercial reception
"Under the Influence" debuted on the Billboard Alternative Songs airplay chart at number 40 in December 2015 and has since reached a peak position of 17. The song has also reached number three on the Billboard Adult Alternative Songs (or Triple A) airplay chart, her second consecutive top-tier single after "Ex's & Oh's". It has charted on the magazine's Rock Airplay chart, which monitors airplay from all rock formats including the aforementioned, at number 22 and on the Hot Rock Songs chart at 47.

In Canada, the song has reached a peak position of 33 on the Billboard Canada Rock airplay chart, which follows a similar methodology to Rock Airplay.

Charts

Weekly charts

Year end charts

Release history

References

2014 songs
2015 singles
Elle King songs
Number-one singles in Iceland
RCA Records singles
Songs written by Dave Bassett (songwriter)